In the Torah, Ithamar was the fourth (and the youngest) son of Aaron the High Priest. Following the construction of the Tabernacle, he was responsible for recording an inventory to ensure that the constructed Tabernacle and its contents conformed to the vision given by God to Moses on Mount Sinai.

Kohen
After the death of his two eldest brothers, Nadab and Abihu, when they had been punished by the Lord for performing an unauthorized incense offering, Ithamar served as a priest along with his elder brother, Eleazar, and Ithamar and Eleazar are regarded as the direct male ancestors of all Kohanim.

 records an incident when Moses was angry with Eleazar and Ithamar, for failing to eat a sin offering inside the Tabernacle in accordance with the regulations set out in the preceding chapters of Leviticus regarding the entitlement of the priests to a share of the offerings they made on behalf of the Israelite people.

During the travels of the Israelites in the wilderness, Ithamar was responsible for the work of the sons of Gershon and Merari, the carriers of the Tabernacle fittings and structures, whilst Eleazar was responsible for the work of the sons of Kohath, who carried the cult objects (the ark, the altar and the lampstand).

He was also in charge of the work of the Levites in general.

Descendants
According to Samaritan sources a civil war broke out between the sons of Ithamar (Eli) and the sons of Phinehas {a son of Eleazar son of Aaron the High Priest} which resulted in the division of those who followed Eli and those who followed High Priest Uzzi ben Bukki at Mount Gerizim Bethel (a third group followed neither). Likewise according to Samaritan sources the high priests line of the sons of Phineas died out in 1624 with the death of the 112th High Priest Shlomyah ben Pinhas when the priesthood was transferred to the sons of Ithamar; see article Samaritan for list of high priests from 1613 to 2013-the 131st high priest of the Samaritans was Elazar ben Tsedaka ben Yitzhaq; the 132nd high priest was Aharon ben Ab-Chisda ben Yaacob; the 133rd high priest is Aabed-El ben Asher ben Matzliach.

Burial site
The burial site of Ithamar is associated with the Hill of Phinehas as related in the Bible and is attributed with the location of the village of Awarta in the Samarian section of the current day West Bank. Due to the uncertain security situation, the Israel Defense Forces limits visits by Jews to one annual night close to 5 Shevat on the Hebrew calendar (around January or February).

See also
Levite

References

Book of Exodus people
Jewish priests
Family of Aaron
Eli (biblical figure)